Yusuf Iddrisu (born 15 June 1964) is a Ghanaian politician and an Educator. He served as member of the first parliament of the fourth republic of Ghana for the Yendi constituency in the Northern Region of Ghana.

Early life and education 
Yusuf Iddrisu was born on June 15, 1964, in the Northern Region of Ghana. He attended Kwame Nkrumah University of Science and Technology and obtained a Bachelor of Arts in Book Industry.

Career 
Yusuf Iddrisu served as a member of parliament in Yendi constituency form 7 January 1993 to 7 January 1997, he was a teacher that time.

Politics 
Yusuf Iddrisu was first elected as member of the first parliament of the fourth republic of Ghana in 1992 Ghanaian parliamentary election on the ticket of the National Democratic Congress. During the 1996 Ghanaian general election, he lost the seat to Malik Al-Hassan Yakubu of the New Patriotic Party (NPP) who won the seat with 13,743 votes which represented 47.60% of the share. He defeated Sulemana Ibn Iddrisu, Jnr. of the National Democratic Congress who obtained 7,107 votes which represented 24.60% of the share and Nalari Nyoja John of the People's National Convention (PNC) who obtained 2,150 votes which represented 7.50% of the share.

Personal life 
He is a Muslim.

References 

1964 births
Ghanaian MPs 1993–1997
National Democratic Congress (Ghana) politicians
Living people
Ghanaian Muslims
Kwame Nkrumah University of Science and Technology alumni
Ghanaian educators
Tamale Senior High School alumni